Kimes is a surname. Notable people with the surname include:

Beverly Rae Kimes (1939–2008), American automotive journalist 
Ira L. Kimes (1899–1949), U.S. Marine Corps general
Mina Kimes (born 1985), American investigative journalist
Royal Wade Kimes (born 1951), American country music singer
Sante Kimes (1934–2014), American murderer
Shannon Kimes (born 1977), American politician

See also
Kime (surname)